ETB 1 is the first television channel from the Euskal Irrati Telebista group in the Basque Autonomous Community, Navarre and the French Basque Country.

The channel broadcasts entirely in the Basque language.

History
In 1979 the Statute of Autonomy of the Basque Country was approved, the document contained the possibility of creating broadcast media owned by the Basque government, which would be used for the normalization of the Basque language.

The channel began test transmissions on 31 December 1982 and officially launched on 16 February 1983 as ETB, using this name until the launch of its sister ETB 2 on 31 May 1986, at which point ETB was renamed to ETB 1. A HD feed of ETB 1 was launched on 21 December 2016.

ETB 1 was the first regional channel in Spain, also becoming the first channel to break the monopoly held by TVE 1 and TVE 2.

Its reception area comprises the whole Basque Country — i.e. the Basque Autonomous Community, Navarre and the Northern Basque Country — and some surrounding places.

Programming
Its programming includes: interviews, films, documentaries, sports, youth and children's programmes, making a strong emphasis on sports and children's programming.

The EiTB group's second main television channel, ETB 2, broadcasts in Spanish.

See also
ETB 2
ETB 3
ETB 4
ETB Sat
Canal Vasco
Nerea Alias

 Betizu
 Egin Kantu!
 Euskal Herria Zuzenean
 Gure kasa

References

External links
Official site of ETB1

EITB
Television stations in Spain
Television channels and stations established in 1983
Basque-language television stations